Chinese military texts have existed ever since Chinese civilization was founded. China's armies have long benefited from this rich strategic tradition, influenced by texts such as Sun Tzu's The Art of War, that have deeply influenced military thought. Although traditional Chinese Confucian philosophy favoured peaceful political solutions and showed contempt for brute military force, the military was influential in most Chinese states. The works of well known strategists such as Sun Tzu and Sun Bin have heavily influenced military philosophy, warfare, and political discourse throughout China's long history. Works such as The Art of War have also found a strong following around the world, where they have influenced people as far ranging as the Chinese Communist Party and the former Secretary of Defense Donald Rumsfeld.

Overview
The most well known of these military texts are the Seven Military Classics. The texts were canonized under this name during the 11th century AD, and from the Song Dynasty onwards were included in most military encyclopedias.  For imperial officers, either some or all of the works were required reading to merit promotion, analogous to the requirement for all bureaucrats to study and become familiar with Confucius' work.  There were many anthologies with different notations and analyses by scholars throughout the centuries leading up to the present versions in Western publishing. Members of the Chinese Communist Party also studied the texts during the Chinese Civil War as well as many European and American military minds.

Usage
The table's columns (except for Content and Images) are sortable by pressing the relevant arrows symbols. The following gives an overview of what is included in the table and how the sorting works.
Name: the name as traditionally used by scholars
Author: name of the author(s)
Content: brief overview of the military text and its content
Dynasty: dynasty or time period
Date: year; The column entries sort by year
Origin: the state from which the text originated from, this applies mainly to the Warring States period and the Spring and Autumn period, when Chinese civilization was fractured into many independent kingdoms
Image: picture of the document, an illustration from the document, a related document, or the alleged author of the document
Description: a brief description of the image

Military Texts

Seven Military Classics

Others

References

Sources
 Sun, Tzu, The Art of War, Translated by Sam B. Griffith (2006), Blue Heron Books, 
 Needham, Joseph (1986). Science and Civilization in China: Volume 5, Chemistry and Chemical Technology, Part 7, Military Technology; the Gunpowder Epic. Taipei: Caves Books Ltd.

Texts
 
Military texts